Stefanie Posavec is a London-based information designer whose work focuses on non-traditional representations of data, born in 1981. She co-authored the 2016 book Dear Data with Giorgia Lupi.

Education
Posavec graduated from Colorado State University with a Bachelor of fine Arts (B.F.A.) in Graphic Design. In 2004, she went on to receive a Master of Arts (M.A.) in Communications Design at Central Saint Martins (CSM) College of Art and Design at the University of the Arts London (UAL). Posavec credits her experience at CSM with cultivating her interest in data.

After receiving her M.A., Posavec worked as a book cover designer and a freelancer for data-related design projects.

Work
In 2010, Posavec helped design and collect data for the cover art featured on OK Go's album, Of the Blue Colour of the Sky. She was the 2013 Facebook Artist in Residence, creating the piece "Relationship Dance Steps."

Posavec also co-authored Dear Data with Giorgia Lupi in 2016. Dear Data is a culmination of a year-long project translating personal data into hand-drawn visualizations. The book was designated "Most Beautiful" at the Kantar Information is Beautiful Awards in 2015 and was nominated for the Design Museum’s "Designs of the Year" award in 2016. In 2016, Dear Data was acquired by the Museum of Modern Art as a part of its permanent collection.

Her work is exhibited at various museums and art houses, including the Museum of Modern Art (MoMA) in New York, the Centro Cultural Banco do Brasil in Rio de Janeiro, the Science Gallery in Dublin, and the Victoria and Albert Museum in London.

References

1981 births
Living people
Colorado State University alumni
Alumni of Central Saint Martins
American graphic designers
Data scientists
American women graphic designers